The Arica Mountains are a small mountain range in northern Riverside County, California. The Granite Mountains lie about 8 miles to the west. They are in the Colorado Desert, in the Lower Colorado River Valley region. They are north the Palen Mountains and Big Maria Mountains; and northwest of Blythe, California.

Palen/McCoy Wilderness Area
The southwest portion of the Arica Mountains lies within the Palen/McCoy Wilderness Area. managed by the Bureau of Land Management.

Within the Palen-McCoy Wilderness are the Arica, Granite, Palen, Little Maria, and McCoy Mountains, which are five distinct mountain ranges separated by broad sloping alluvial fans-bajadas. Because this large area incorporates so many major geological features, the diversity of vegetation and landforms is exceptional. The desert wash woodland found here provides food and cover for burro deer, coyote, bobcat, gray fox, and mountain lion. Desert pavement, bajadas, interior valleys, canyons, dense ironwood forests, canyons and rugged peaks form a constantly changing landscape pattern.

References

External links
Official Palen-McCoy Wilderness Area website
BLM Palen-McCoy Wilderness Map
Palen-McCoy Wilderness Area photographs

Mountain ranges of the Colorado Desert
Protected areas of the Colorado Desert
Mountain ranges of the Lower Colorado River Valley
Wilderness areas within the Lower Colorado River Valley
Mountain ranges of Riverside County, California
Protected areas of Riverside County, California
Bureau of Land Management areas in California
Blythe, California